Rhabdophis pentasupralabialis is a keelback snake in the family Colubridae. It was originally described as subspecies of Rhabdophis nuchalis.

References

Rhabdophis
Snakes of China
Endemic fauna of China
Reptiles described in 1983
Taxa named by Zhao Ermi